Lacalma argenteorubra is a species of snout moth in the genus Lacalma. It was described by George Hampson in 1916 and is known from New Guinea.

The wingspan is about 40 mm.

References

Moths described in 1916
Epipaschiinae